Jhongli Station might refer to following train stations in Taiwan:
 Jhongli Station (Taoyuan County)：A train station along Taiwan Railway Administration Western Mainline Line.
 Jhongli Station (Yilan County):A train station along Taiwan Railway Administration Yilan Line.